Giani Pritam Singh Dhillon was an Indian freedom fighter and Sikh missionary who, as a member of the Ghadar Party, was instrumental in the planning of the failed 1915 Ghadar conspiracy in the British Indian Army. Giani Pritam Singh Dhillon was a close friend of Gurbaksh Singh Dhillon, famous Sikh Indian independence movement leader and prominent member of the Indian National Army. He was also close associate of Subhas Chandra Bose. Pritam Singh is also remembered for reviving the same idea during World War II by seeking Japanese support in the establishment of what came to be the Indian National Army. Pritam Singh died in a plane crash in 1942.

See also
 Indian Independence League
 Indian National Army in Singapore
 Mohan Singh (general), INA
 Japanese occupation of Malaya

References
Indian National Army in East Asia. Hindustan Times

Year of birth missing
Sikh missionaries
1942 deaths
Hindu–German Conspiracy
Ghadar Party
Indian independence movement
Indian revolutionaries
Indian National Army personnel
Indian Independence League